Daniel Buchholz is a German art dealer, the founder of Galerie Buchholz in Berlin and Cologne.

Gallery
Buchholz founded Galerie Buchholz in Cologne in 1986, and a further gallery in Berlin in 2008.

Since 2022, Buchholz has been serving on the selection committee of Art Basel's Paris edition.

Recognition
In 2014, The Guardian named Buchholz in their "Movers and makers: the most powerful people in the art world".

References

Living people
German art dealers
Year of birth missing (living people)